"Cadê Dalila" (Where is Dalila) is a song performed by the Brazilian singer Ivete Sangalo, released as the lead single from her album Pode Entrar.
It was released in January 2009 on the radio stations and was a Carnaval hit.

Success
The song was released a month earlier from the Carnaval and was a massive hit there too.
In Portugal the song was a minor hit.

References

2009 singles
Songs written by Carlinhos Brown
2009 songs